Larry Harrison may refer to:

 Larry Harrison (basketball) (born 1955), American basketball coach
 Larry Harrison (politician), Canadian politician
Larry Harrison (arena football), played in 2010 Dallas Vigilantes season

See also
Lawrence Harrison (disambiguation)